The third season of the Russian reality talent show The Voice premiered on 5 September 2014 on Channel One. Dmitry Nagiev returns as the show's presenter. Leonid Agutin, Pelageya, Alexander Gradsky, and Dima Bilan return as coaches.
Alexandra Vorobyeva won the competition and Alexander Gradsky became the winning coach for the third time.

Coaches and presenter 

Leonid Agutin, Pelageya, Alexander Gradsky, and Dima Bilan return for their 3rd season as coaches.

Dmitry Nagiev returns for his 3rd season as a presenter.

Teams
 Colour key

Blind auditions
Colour key

Episode 1 (Sep. 5) 
The coaches performed "Come Together" at the start of the show.

Note: Ivan Urgant, a famous presenter, made a special performance with the song "Обернитесь" in this episode. No coach pressed their button.

Episode 2 (Sep. 12)

Episode 3 (Sep. 19)

Episode 4 (Sep. 26)

Episode 5 (Oct. 3)
Note: Daniil Gradsky, Alexander Gradsky's son, made a special performance with the song "Tears in Heaven" in this episode. Pelageya and Dima turned for him.

Episode 6 (Oct. 10)

The Battles 
The Battles round started with episode 7 and ended with episode 10 (broadcast on 17, 24, 31 October 2014; on 7 November 2014). The coaches can steal two losing artists from another coach. Contestants who win their battle or are stolen by another coach will advance to the Knockout rounds.
Colour key

The Knockouts 
The Knockouts round started with episode 11 and ended with episode 13 (broadcast on 14, 21, 28 November 2014).

The top 24 contestants will then move on to the "Live Shows."
Colour key

Live shows 
Colour key:

Week 1, 2: Quarterfinal (5 and 12 December) 
The Top 24 performed on Fridays, December 5 and 12, 2014. The two artists from the team with the fewest votes left the competition by the end of the nights.

Week 3: Semifinal (19 December) 
The Top 8 performed on Friday, 19 December 2014. The one artist from the each team with the fewest votes left the competition by the end of the night.

Week 4: Final (26 December) 
The Top 4 performed on Friday, 26 December 2014. This week, the four finalists performed two solo cover songs and a duet with their coach.

Reception

Rating

References

The Voice (Russian TV series)
2014 Russian television seasons